Ashley Lyle and Bart Nickerson are American screenwriters and producers known for creating and executive producing the Showtime drama series Yellowjackets.

Biography 
Lyle was born in New Jersey and grew up in Belmar, New Jersey. She graduated from Lawrenceville School and received her B.A. and MFA from Columbia University. Nickerson hails from Monmouth County, New Jersey, having been raised in Middletown Township, New Jersey. The couple met on the East Coast and moved to Los Angeles in 2007 with the intention of becoming TV writers and landed their first job writing for The Originals.

Lyle and Nickerson also wrote for other TV shows such as Narcos and Dispatches from Elsewhere.

In 2022, Lyle and Nickerson were nominated for the Writers Guild of America Award for Television: New Series and Writers Guild of America Award for Television: Dramatic Series for creating the Showtime series Yellowjackets. In August 2022, they had signed an overall deal with Showtime.

Filmography

References

External links
 
 

21st-century American screenwriters
American male screenwriters
American producers
American screenwriters
American women screenwriters
American women television producers
Columbia College (New York) alumni
Columbia University School of the Arts alumni
Filmmaking duos
Living people
Screenwriters from New Jersey
Screenwriting duos
Year of birth missing (living people)
Lawrenceville School alumni